= Emilio Williams =

American dramatist

Emilio Williams is a playwright whose plays have been produced in Spain, Argentina, France, Estonia, the United Kingdom and the United States (including productions and performances in Chicago, New York, Washington DC, Los Angeles and Mexico). He is also part of the alternative theater scene in Spain.

His comedy Your Problem with Men was produced by Teatro Luna in Chicago, and has traveled to New York City, Los Angeles and the Edinburgh Fringe Festival.

In 2012, his one-woman show Medea’s Got Some Issues received “Best International Show” at United Solo Festival, Off Broadway, New York City. The show was performed in the 2014 D.C. Fringe Festival and Chicago in 2016.

Also in 2012, his comedy Smartphones – a pocket-size farce, received its world première at Trap Door Theatre in Chicago. The Spanish première took place at the Teatro Lara in Madrid. The play received its East Coast première in a production by Ambassador Theatre in Washington DC. In 2016, Andrés Naime presented the première of Smartphones in Mexico City. The play is included in an anthology of new Spanish plays, Eight Works by Seven Playwrights, published in English by the Martin E. Segal Center.

In 2010, his “dramedy” “Tables and Beds, an unromantic comedy“ was selected among 80 plays from 12 countries as the winner of the 4th Premio el Espectáculo Teatoral.

Emilio Williams has degrees in journalism and in film and video. In the 1990s, he worked for CNN in Atlanta and Washington and, between 2001 and 2011, was employed by Johns Hopkins University.

In 2011, he moved permanently to Chicago, the city where his father was born.

== Plays ==
=== Plays premièred in Spanish ===
- Sonata a Strindberg 2007
- Si viví es por algo, siempre pienso 2008
- Camas y Mesas 2010
- Medea Vindicada 2010
- España, SL 2011

=== Plays premièred in English ===
- A Strindberg Sonata 2010
- Medea's got some issues 2011
- Smartphones, a pocket–size farce 2012
- Tables and Beds 2013
- Your problem with men 2013
